Mafamude e Vilar do Paraíso is a civil parish in the municipality of Vila Nova de Gaia, Portugal. It was formed in 2013 by the merger of the former parishes Mafamude and Vilar do Paraíso. The population in 2011 was 52,422, in an area of 10.58 km².

References

Freguesias of Vila Nova de Gaia